This article contains lists of tourist attractions in England.

 Abbeys and priories in England
 List of amusement parks in the United Kingdom
Amongst the most popular amusement and theme parks in England are Pleasure Beach Blackpool, Alton Towers, Thorpe Park and Legoland Windsor.
 Anglo-Saxon sites in England
There are very few surviving Anglo-Saxon buildings in England, however countless artefacts from the age can be seen in museums across the country.
 Aquariums in England
Some of England's larger and most visited aquariums include the Blue Planet Aquarium, The Deep, the  National Sea Life Centre and Oceanarium Bournemouth.
 Art museums and galleries in England
London's National Gallery and Tate Modern both received in excess of 4.7 million visitors in 2009. Other notable English art galleries include the National Portrait Gallery, Tate Britain, Tate Liverpool, Saatchi Gallery, Manchester Art Gallery, Tate St Ives and the Walker Art Gallery.
 Beaches in England
England, being part of the island of Great Britain, has many beaches. The nation's favourites are often cited as being in Devon and Cornwall although the northern towns of Blackpool and Scarborough are also famed seaside resorts. Other notable beaches in England include Chesil Beach, Fistral Beach and the beaches of the Jurassic Coast.
 Casinos in England
England is not famed for its casinos, but other forms of betting are popular throughout the country.
 Castles in England
The Tower of London is the most visited castle in England (with 2,389,548 visitors in 2009). Leeds Castle, Dover Castle, Windsor Castle, Lindisfarne Castle and Warwick Castle are also amongst England's more notable castles.
 Festivals in England
There are festivals and carnivals year-round in the UK, catering to every possible music and cultural genre. The Notting Hill Carnival is the second largest street festival in the world; the Carnaval del Pueblo is Europe's largest celebration of Latin American culture; whilst events such as Creamfields, V Festival, Glastonbury Festival and the Reading and Leeds Festivals tend to attract younger generations.
 Gardens in England
 Heritage railways in England
 Hill forts in England
 Historic houses in England
 Indoor Arenas in England
 Market towns in England
 Monuments and memorials in England
 Museums in England
 National parks in England
 Nature reserves in England
 Palaces in England
 Parks in England
 Piers in England
 Prehistoric sites in England
 Roman sites in England
 Seaside resorts in England
 Shopping centres in England
 Stadiums in England
 Zoos in England

See also
 Tourism in England
 Economy of England
 Transport in England
 Lists of tourist attractions
 List of tourist attractions in the Isle of Wight
 List of tourist attractions in Kent
 List of tourist attractions in London
 List of tourist attractions in Oxford
 List of tourist attractions in Sheffield
 List of tourist attractions in Somerset

References

Tourist attractions
 
England